Riverside Cemetery is a historic rural cemetery located at 496 Riverside Street in Waterbury, Connecticut on the western bank of the Naugatuck River.

The property also includes many older burials and headstones dating back to the late 1700s which were relocated from the defunct Grand Street burial ground.

The cemetery was added to the National Register of Historic Places in 1988.

History
From the late 1700s to the mid 1800s, burials in Waterbury took place at the old burial grounds now known as Library Park on Grand Street. The first suggestion for a new cemetery in Waterbury was made in 1849 by Dr. Amos S. Blake.  An association was formed on March 6, 1850 and money was raised through the sale of burial lots.

The bronze statue, Wisdom, on the Benedict family monument was designed by Truman Howe Bartlett in 1871 and sculpted by Ferdinand von Miller in 1872.

The modern Gothic Hall Memorial Chapel was designed by noted Waterbury architect Robert W. Hill and completed in 1885.

The monument to Civil War Colonel John Lyman Chatfield was designed by George Edwin Bissell and was unveiled at a ceremony on September 13, 1887.

The Elton Memorial Vase sits at the entrance of the cemetery.  It was designed by George Edwin Bissell and cast by Fonderia Galli in 1905.  The bronze monument depicts four scenes from the Life of Christ.  The first side depicts the adoration of the Wise Men; the second side, the Crucifixion; the third side, the entombment; and the fourth side, the Resurrection.  Decorative figures carrying wreaths form the handles with the vase supported by cherubs.  The large bronze figures on the side of the vase depict Grief and Faith.

Notable Burials 

Ruth Muskrat Bronson (1897-1982), Cherokee poet, educator and Native-American rights activist
Calvin Holmes Carter (1829 -1887), politician
Franklin Carter (1837 -1919), president of Williams College
 John Lyman Chatfield (1826 -1863), U.S. Civil War Union Army Colonel
 Augustus Sabin Chase (1828 -1896), industrialist
 John Prince Elton (1809 -1864), industrialist
 Fortune, (1743 -1798), African-American slave
Edward Wheeler Goss (1893 -1972), U.S. Congressman
Wilfred E. Griggs (1866-1918), architect
 Robert W. Hill (1828 -1909), architect
David Hoadley (1774 -1839), architect
 Stephen Wright Kellogg (1822 -1904), U.S. Congressman
 Green Kendrick (1798 -1873), 43rd Lieutenant Governor of Connecticut
 George L. Lilley (1859 -1909), U.S. Congressman, 63rd Governor of Connecticut
William Hampton Patton (1853-1918), entomologist
Charles A. Templeton (1871-1955), 68th Governor of Connecticut
Allen B. Wilson (1823 -1888), inventor and sewing machine manufacturer

Gallery

Citations

References

External links 
Riverside Cemetery at Find A Grave
Riverside Cemetery Association website
National Register of Historic Places listing

1853 establishments in Connecticut
Buildings and structures in Waterbury, Connecticut
Cemeteries established in the 1850s
Cemeteries in New Haven County, Connecticut
National Register of Historic Places in New Haven County, Connecticut
Rural cemeteries